DYBR (711 AM) was a radio station owned and operated by the Philippine Collective Media Corporation. It was formerly known as Apple Radio from April 2011 November 2013, when its transmitter was destroyed by Typhoon Yolanda.

References

Radio stations in Tacloban
Radio stations established in 2011
Radio stations disestablished in 2013
Defunct radio stations in the Philippines